Richard Phillips (born 1962) is an American artist. He is known  for large-scale paintings based on pornographic photographs of women. He paints in a photo-realistic or hyper-realistic style.

Early life and education
Phillips was born in Marblehead, Massachusetts. In 1984, he received a Bachelor of Fine Arts in painting from Massachusetts College of Art and Design and in 1986, he received a Master of Fine Arts in painting from Yale School of Art.

Career

In the 1990s, Phillips worked at the Guggenheim Museum as an art handler.

In 2008, a version of his painting Spectrum was included on Gossip Girl.

In May-June 2010, his works were featured in the Swiss Institute Contemporary Art New York along with works by Adolf Dietrich.

In 2011, Phillips created short films starring Lindsay Lohan and Sasha Grey for the Gagosian Gallery.

In 2012, he debuted another short film titled First Point, starring Lindsay  Lohan, and scored by Thomas Bangalter, at Art Basel in Switzerland.

In 2013, he created a Sasha Grey portrait for the Frieze Art Fair.

In 2013, he collaborated with Playboy magazine to create a roadside installation near Marfa, Texas; he mounted a black-painted 1970s muscle car on an inclined concrete plinth beside a large symbol from the magazine.

In 2014, Phillips was featured at Dallas Contemporary.

Personal life
Phillips lives in New York City. He has a studio in the Starrett–Lehigh Building.

Bibliography

References

1962 births
Living people
Massachusetts College of Art and Design alumni
People from Marblehead, Massachusetts
Yale School of Art alumni